Boulevard is a census-designated place (CDP) in the Mountain Empire area of southeastern San Diego County, California. At the 2010 census, it had a population of 315. The area is rural high desert along the Mexican border near the eastern extent of San Diego County.

The Boulevard area encompasses the communities of Manzanita, Live Oak Springs and Tierra Del Sol. Nearby communities in the same wire center (central office) for wired telephones include: Calexico Lodge, Jacumba, Live Oak Springs, Manzanita, Pueblo Siding, and Tierra del Sol. Default wired telephone numbers for this area follow the format (619) 766-xxxx. The ZIP code is 91905.

History
The Kumeyaay and Cocopah Indians were Boulevard's earliest inhabitants, and the area is rich in Native American history, culture and archeological resources. Today Boulevard is the headquarters of the Manzanita Band of Diegueno Mission Indians.

An area near Calexico Lodge is occasionally referred to as Eckener Pass. Reportedly, this is a reference to German Zeppelin pioneer Hugo Eckener. In August 1929, Hugo Eckener's Zeppelin Z-127 "Graf Zeppelin", a sister ship of the Hindenburg, landed here on the Los Angeles-Chicago leg of her round-the-world tour.

The town and post office were named Boulevard after US Highway 80 which ran through town. Eventually Interstate 8 was constructed, bypassing the town. Local residents report an alternate version of the origin of the name. Boulevard used to be a stage coach stop, reportedly near today's McCain Valley road, east of today's core of Boulevard. Coming from Arizona, this stop was on the first long, flat straight stretch of road, "a boulevard", after climbing the winding In-Ko-Pah mountains and passing through windier roads in Jacumba.

In January 2007, the La Posta Casino, owned and operated by the La Posta Band of Mission Indians, opened.  It was the smallest casino in the county until it closed in 2012 due to its financial situation.

Geography
According to the United States Census Bureau, the CDP covers an area of 3.9 square miles (10.1 km), all land. However, this only includes the village area of Boulevard. More commonly, Boulevard includes rural outlying areas. The Boulevard Community Planning Group includes approximately 55,350 acres, or about 86 square miles.

Located in the East County section of San Diego County, Boulevard with its unique transitional location straddles the Tecate Divide, between the Laguna Mountains above and the desert below, providing views of the surrounding Laguna, In-Ko-Pah and Sierra de Juarez mountains.

The US Post Office is plotted at  although the actual post office has since moved approximately two miles west near the separation of Old Highway 80 and State Route 94. The post office, and the community it serves, has the ZIP Code 91905.

Regulatory filings show a California Department of Transportation facility described as a highway maintenance station in Boulevard.

Climate
According to the Köppen Climate Classification system, Boulevard has a warm-summer Mediterranean climate, abbreviated "Csa" on climate maps.

Demographics

The 2010 United States Census reported that Boulevard had a population of 315. However, other sources report a population of more than 2000. The discrepancy is likely due to exactly which areas are included in the unincorporated area. The racial makeup of Boulevard was 272 (86.3%) White, 2 (0.6%) African American, 7 (2.2%) Native American, 3 (1.0%) Asian, 0 (0.0%) Pacific Islander, 14 (4.4%) from other races, and 17 (5.4%) from two or more races. Hispanic or Latino of any race were 44 persons (14.0%).

The Census reported that 315 people (100% of the population) lived in households, 0 (0%) lived in non-institutionalized group quarters, and 0 (0%) were institutionalized. However, Boulevard does have a prison facility, the McCain Valley Conservation Camp, as well as a border patrol facility with detention space.

There were 135 households, out of which 35 (25.9%) had children under the age of 18 living in them, 66 (48.9%) were opposite-sex married couples living together, 12 (8.9%) had a female householder with no husband present, 5 (3.7%) had a male householder with no wife present.  There were 7 (5.2%) unmarried opposite-sex partnerships, and 1 (0.7%) same-sex married couples or partnerships. 46 households (34.1%) were made up of individuals, and 17 (12.6%) had someone living alone who was 65 years of age or older. The average household size was 2.33.  There were 83 families (61.5% of all households); the average family size was 2.96.

The population was spread out, with 71 people (22.5%) under the age of 18, 9 people (2.9%) aged 18 to 24, 59 people (18.7%) aged 25 to 44, 123 people (39.0%) aged 45 to 64, and 53 people (16.8%) who were 65 years of age or older.  The median age was 49.2 years. For every 100 females, there were 114.3 males.  For every 100 females age 18 and over, there were 108.5 males.

The homeowner vacancy rate was 2.3%; the rental vacancy rate was 17.5%.  186 people (59.0% of the population) lived in owner-occupied housing units and 129 people (41.0%) lived in rental housing units.

Government
At the federal level, Boulevard is split between California's 51st congressional district, represented by Democrat Juan Vargas and California's 50th congressional district, represented by Republican Darrell Issa.

Education
Local students attend Cover Flat Elementary School, Mountain Empire Junior High School, and Mountain Empire High School.

Cultural References
The Alfred Hitchcock Hour episode "Goodbye, George" involves a road trip along Highway 80 through Boulevard.

References

Census-designated places in San Diego County, California
Census-designated places in California